Charles Armstrong School, located in Belmont, California, is an independent, non-profit, co-educational lower and middle day school specializing in teaching students with language-based learning differences, such as dyslexia. Armstrong helps its students re-enter traditional public and private schools with the learning tools necessary to be language proficient. Tuition, grants and donations support Charles Armstrong School, which is the only school of its kind in the San Francisco Bay Area.

The school provides a full academic program, along with elective classes for middle school students, and extracurricular sports and drama activities.

Charles Armstrong School is certified by the California State Board of Education and has received the highest rating from the Western Association of Schools and Colleges.

History
Charles Armstrong School first opened its doors in 1968 to eighteen dyslexic children in the second, third and fourth grades.  The school was housed in a renovated single dwelling home on University Drive in the downtown area of Menlo Park, and consisted of three classrooms and a business office.

While the Charles Armstrong School opened in 1968, its roots may be traced to two occurrences some years before.  In 1960, a group of concerned Bay Area parents first gathered to discuss a puzzling phenomenon – the fact that their intelligent, motivated, and healthy children were unable to learn how to read.  This group of parents began to meet in an attempt to find solutions to their children's learning problems. They found that pediatricians were often helpful in diagnosing the condition, but were unable to suggest how the learning difficulties might be overcome.

In an otherwise unrelated event, Charles D. Armstrong, physician and founder of the Menlo Medical Clinic died in 1962 at the age of 44.  Eager to perpetuate the memory of a community leader whose brilliant career was suddenly cut short, friends and patients of Dr. Armstrong established The Charles Armstrong Memorial Foundation dedicated to “improving the well being of the community by applying today’s knowledge to today’s problems.”

The plight of children with dyslexia was brought to the attention of the Foundation by the group of concerned and active Bay Area parents.  The directors of The Armstrong Foundation were impressed by the importance and prevalence of the problem, and formed a committee led by director Wilbur E. Mattison, Jr., M.D., a colleague of Dr. Armstrong's at the Menlo Medical Clinic, to survey the needs of Bay Area children with specific language disability.  The Armstrong Foundation sponsored several symposia inviting medical and educational experts from around the nation to examine the nature of dyslexia, how it could be recognized, and most revolutionary at the time – what could be done about it.  One symposium in 1966 drew over one thousand parents, teachers, school administrators, physicians, and psychologists to listen to a panel discussion about this invisible disability and new teaching techniques that would enable the dyslexic learner to read.

Initially the Charles Armstrong School's academic program focused only on improving language skills, with the intent that after two or three years in the school, students would be equipped to re-enter a public or private school successfully. Later, the school added a full academic program and extracurricular activities.

The school moved several times before purchasing the former McDougal Elementary School in Belmont, California, moving there in 1984. At one time Charles Armstrong School included a high school, but later returned to offering only the elementary and middle school. Charles Armstrong School has schooled over 3,000 students during its history.

References

External links
 Charles Armstrong School website
 LD Resources:  Sanford Shapiro looks at The Charles Armstrong School - 2006
 NCBIDA - Northern California Branch of the International Dyslexia Association
 Greatschools.net profile
 Independent School Directory profile
 Private School Review profile
 Additional Referrals

Private elementary schools in California
Private middle schools in California
Special schools in the United States
Education in San Mateo County, California